The 61st Alabama Infantry Regiment was an infantry regiment of the Confederate States Army regiment during the American Civil War. The regiment was composed of nine companies from the southern parts of Alabama.

Organization and service

The regiment was formed at Pollard, Alabama on May 2, 1863 as a battalion with nine companies, and attached to the Department of the Gulf.

It was increased to a regiment on April 11, 1864 and shortly after sent to Virginia, where it was placed Battle's Brigade, Rodes Division, II Corps, Army of Northern Virginia. The transfer was a  compensation for the 26th Alabama of that brigade, who had been sent on detached duty in February 1864 to convey prisoners to Andersonville, but did not return.

The regiment served with that brigade in the Army of Northern Virginia and the Valley District, until the surrender at Appomattox Courthouse on April 9, 1865.

See also
List of Alabama Civil War Confederate units

Notes

References
 U.S. War Department, The War of the Rebellion: a Compilation of the Official Records of the Union and Confederate Armies, U.S. Government Printing Office, 1880–1901.
 Stewart Sifakis. Compendium of the Confederate Armies: Alabama. Facts on File, NY 1992 

Units and formations of the Confederate States Army from Alabama